is a four-episode anime OVA based on the Japanese video game Corpse Party.  It serves as a sequel to the Corpse Party: Missing Footage OVA.

Cast

Episode list

Production
The original video animation was announced by game production company MAGES on 2 August 2012 as a sequel to the Corpse Party: Missing Footage OVA, which was released on the same day as the announcement.

The series was directed by Akira Iwanaga and written by Shoichi Sato, with animation by the studio Asread. Seiki Tanaka provided the series' character designs, as well as serving as chief animation director.

Release
Game maker 5pb. streamed three promotional videos for the OVAs prior to their release, on 22 December 2012, 28 May 2013, and 28 June 2013.

The OVAs received a special screening in Osaka on 15 June 2013, which was attended by members of the staff and cast. They were released as four episodes on 24 July 2013, and were available either as two DVDs or a Blu-ray box set.

Section23 Films licensed the series for release in North America under its Maiden Japan imprint, and released it on DVD and Blu-ray on 26 January 2016.

Reception
The series has acquired recognition as one of the most gruesome anime series in existence.

Reviewing the series for Anime News Network, Theron Martin gave the North American Blu-ray release an overall grade of B, writing that "if hyperviolent fare on the level of Elfen Lied, Ninja Scroll, or Hellsing Ultimate is beyond your tolerance range then give Corpse Party a wide, wide berth. If, however, you revel in such titles then this one is a must-see."  He praised the OVA's art and animation, but was less pleased with the story.  He concluded that the series' "absolutely nails its main selling point – its graphic content and the visuals supporting it – and that is, indeed, all that really matters."

Chris Beveridge also gave the series a B on The Fandom Post, writing that "[i]t's plainly not my cup of tea, to be honest, but I can admire what they do and I imagine for your average viewer that doesn't see this often it'll be pretty disturbing."  Commenting on the animation, he said "the show has a good look about it without being too detailed or too realistic so that it doesn't freak you out completely."  He also commented that "[t]he character animation comes across well and the backgrounds are largely solid." He concluded by saying that "it's likely to be a bit of a cult show in the long run. And rightly so as I can imagine a good number of fans keeping this one handy to introduce people to an area of anime not produced often these days outside of some hentai shows."

The reviewers were split on the lack of an English dub, with Martin calling it "a curious choice, as I would think fare like this would sell well enough in the States (and possibly even beyond the normal otaku crowd) to warrant an English dub," while Beveridge wrote, "I can't imagine too many actors wanting to get in on this one considering the brutality with the kids, but it's also not a property that has huge recognition over here to warrant risking it."

References

External links
 

Corpse Party
Asread
Maiden Japan
Horror anime and manga
Mystery anime and manga
OVAs based on video games
ja:コープスパーティー Tortured Souls -暴虐された魂の呪叫-